Hop Along is an American indie rock band from Philadelphia, Pennsylvania, formerly known as Hop Along, Queen Ansleis.

History
Hop Along began as an acoustic freak folk solo project known as Hop Along, Queen Ansleis in 2004, during Frances Quinlan's senior year in high school. Quinlan released their debut album Freshman Year in the summer of 2005.

Quinlan performed an acoustic solo act for several years as they honed their style. "I would envy [full ensembles] because I thought that a band inherently carries more energy than a person does solo. I suppose you could argue that point, but when I was playing by myself it was just out of necessity. I wanted to play and I just couldn’t seem to get a band together. I wanted to write and I didn’t want to wait for anybody."

Three years after Quinlan's first album, their brother Mark joined the project as drummer, followed by bassist Tyler Long in 2009. After their new formation, the band's name was shortened to Hop Along. The band went on to release an EP, Wretches, in 2009. They released their second full-length album Get Disowned on May 5, 2012, winning a highly positive critical response from the independent music press. Quinlan stated they wished to have the album produced by a friend as opposed to a stranger. The band approached Joe Reinhart of Algernon Cadwallader, who Quinlan had met through the Philadelphia basement show scene, to produce the album. Reinhart was later added to the band's lineup on lead guitar.

In October 2014, Hop Along signed to indie rock label Saddle Creek Records, which released the band's third full-length record, Painted Shut, on May 4, 2015.

On January 22, 2018, the title and tracklisting of the band's fourth full-length record was revealed. The first single "How Simple" appeared on streaming sites the next day after a postcard vinyl was sent in the mail. The nine-track Bark Your Head Off, Dog was released on April 6, 2018. It was recorded by Joe Reinhart and Kyle Pulley at Headroom Studios.

Members
Current Members
Frances Quinlan - vocals, guitar (2005-present)
Mark Quinlan - drums (2009-present)
Tyler Long - bass (2009-present)
Joe Reinhart - guitar (2012-present)

Other types of members
Dominic Angelella - guitar (2012)
Peter Helmis - album layout (2012)
Jacki Sulley - guitar, keyboard

Timeline

Discography

Albums
 Freshman Year (as Hop Along, Queen Ansleis) (2005)
 Get Disowned (2012)
 Painted Shut (2015)
 Bark Your Head Off, Dog (2018)

EPs
 Songs of The Sea (as Hop Along, Queen Ansleis) (2004)
 Is Something Wrong? (as Hop Along, Queen Ansleis) (2009)
 Wretches (2009)

References

American folk rock groups
Indie rock musical groups from Pennsylvania
Musical groups from Philadelphia
Musical groups established in 2004
Saddle Creek Records artists